Fissurina subcomparimuralis is a species of lichen in the family Graphidaceae. Found in Florida, it was described as new to science in 2011.

References

Lichen species
Lichens described in 2011
Lichens of the Southeastern United States
Ostropales
Taxa named by Robert Lücking
Fungi without expected TNC conservation status